Yéréré is a small town and commune in the Cercle of Nioro in the Kayes Region of western Mali. The commune lies on the border with Mauritania.

References

Communes of Kayes Region